MT3 may refer to:
 Melatonin receptor 1C
 Metallothionein-3
 Montana Highway 3